In 1983 the British and Irish Lions toured New Zealand for the first time since 1977. The Lions went down to a 4–0 whitewash for only the second time in history – the previous was also inflicted by the All Blacks on the 1966 Lions. Overall the Lions played eighteen matches, winning twelve and losing six. In addition to their four test defeats they also lost to the Auckland and Canterbury provincial unions.

The tour was captained by Ciaran Fitzgerald, coached by Jim Telfer and managed by Willie John McBride. The tour lasted 18 matches and almost 3 months, between May and July 1983.

Injuries and replacements
In addition to the players originally selected, six players subsequently joined as replacements or cover for injured players;
Nigel Melville, who had not yet been capped by England, replaced Terry Holmes who was injured in the first test.
Melville was injured himself in his second match and was replaced by Steve Smith.
Eddie Butler replaced Jeff Squire.
Nick Jeavons replaced John O'Driscoll although O'Driscoll did resume playing on the tour.
Donal Lenihan, an original selection who had to withdraw after being diagnosed with a hernia, subsequently replaced Robert Norster.
Gerry McLoughlin replaced Ian Stephens.

Squad

Management
 Manager Willie John McBride (Ireland)
 Coach Jim Telfer (Scotland)
 Doctor Donald McLeod
 Physio Kevin Murphy

Backs
 Robert Ackerman (London Welsh and Wales)
 Roger Baird (Kelso and Scotland), 
 Ollie Campbell (Old Belvedere and Ireland), 
 John Carleton (Orrell and England), 
 Gwyn Evans (Maesteg and Wales), 
 Dusty Hare (Leicester and England)
 Terry Holmes (Cardiff and Wales) 
 David Irwin (Instonians and Ireland) 
 Mike Kiernan (Dolphin and Ireland) 
 Roy Laidlaw (Jedforest and Scotland) 
 Hugo MacNeill (Oxford University and Ireland) 
 Nigel Melville (Wasps) 
 Trevor Ringland (Ballymena and Ireland) 
 John Rutherford (Selkirk and Scotland) 
 Steve Smith (Sale and England) 
 Clive Woodward (Leicester and England)

Forwards
 Steve Bainbridge (Gosforth and England) 
 John Beattie (Glasgow Academicals and Scotland) 
 Steve Boyle (Gloucester and England) 
 Eddie Butler (Pontypool and Wales) 
 Jim Calder (Stewart's Melville FP and Scotland) 
 Maurice Colclough (Angoulême and England) 
 Colin Deans (Hawick and Scotland) 
 Ciaran Fitzgerald (capt) (St Mary's College and Ireland) 
 Nick Jeavons (Moseley and England) 
 ST 'Staff' Jones (Pontypool and Wales) 
 Donal Lenihan (Cork Constitution and Ireland) 
 Gerry McLoughlin (Shannon and Ireland) 
 Iain Milne (Heriot's FP and Scotland) 
 Bob Norster (Cardiff and Wales) 
 John O'Driscoll (London Irish and Ireland) 
 Iain Paxton (Selkirk and Scotland) 
 Graham Price (Pontypool and Wales) 
 Jeff Squire (Pontypool and Wales) 
 Ian Stephens (Bridgend and Wales) 
 Peter Winterbottom (Headingley and England)

Results

The matches

First Test

NEW ZEALAND; Allan Hewson (Well), Stu Wilson (Well), Steven Pokere (Sthl), Bernie Fraser (Well), Warwick Taylor (Cant), Ian Dunn (N Auck), Dave Loveridge (Tar), Murray Mexted (Well), Jock Hobbs (Cant), Andy Haden (Auck), Gary Whetton (Auck), Mark Shaw (Man), John Ashworth (Cant), Andy Dalton (Count, cpt), Gary Knight (Man).

LIONS; MacNeill, Baird, Irwin, Ringland, Ackerman, Campbell, Holmes (rep Laidlaw),Stephens, Fitzgerald (cpt), Price, Paxton, Winterbotom, Norster, Colclough, Squire, .

Second Test

NEW ZEALAND; Allan Hewson (Well), Stu Wilson (Well), Steven Pokere (Sthl), Bernie Fraser (Well), Warwick Taylor (Cant), Wayne Smith (Cant), Dave Loveridge (Tar), Murray Mexted (Well), Jock Hobbs (Cant), Andy Haden (Auck), Gary Whetton (Auck), Mark Shaw (Man), John Ashworth (Cant), Andy Dalton (Count, cpt), Gary Knight (Man).

LIONS; MacNeill, Baird, Irwin, Kiernan, Carleton, Campbell, Laidlaw, Jones, Fitzgerald (cpt), Price, Paxton (rep Beattie), Winterbotom, Norster, Colclough, O'Driscoll.

Third Test

NEW ZEALAND; Allan Hewson (Well), Stu Wilson (Well), Steven Pokere (Sthl), Bernie Fraser (Well), Warwick Taylor (Cant), Wayne Smith (Cant) (rep Arthur Stone (Wai)), Dave Loveridge (Tar), Murray Mexted (Well), Jock Hobbs (Cant), Andy Haden (Auck), Gary Whetton (Auck), Mark Shaw (Man), John Ashworth (Cant), Andy Dalton (Count, cpt), Gary Knight (Man).

LIONS; Evans, Baird, Kiernan, Rutherford, Carleton, Campbell, Laidlaw, Jones, Fitzgerald (cpt), Price, Paxton, Winterbotom, Bainbridge, Colclough, Calder.

Fourth Test

NEW ZEALAND; Allan Hewson (Well), Stu Wilson (Well), Steven Pokere (Sthl), Bernie Fraser (Well), Warwick Taylor (Cant), Ian Dunn (N Auck), Dave Loveridge (Tar), Murray Mexted (Well), Jock Hobbs (Cant), Andy Haden (Auck), Gary Whetton (Auck), Mark Shaw (Man), John Ashworth (Cant), Andy Dalton (Count, cpt), Gary Knight (Man).

LIONS; Evans, Baird (rep Ackerman), Irwin, Kiernan, Campbell (rep MacNeill), Laidlaw, Jones, Fitzgerald (cpt), Price, Paxton, Winterbotom, Bainbridge, Colclough, O'Driscoll.

References

External links 
1983 British Lions tour history
1983 British Lions tour at ESPN

1983 rugby union tours
1983
1983 in New Zealand rugby union
1982–83 in British rugby union
1982–83 in Irish rugby union